Following is a list of football clubs located in Macau.

S.L. Benfica de Macau
Casa de Portugal em Macau
Chao Pak Kei
Hap Kuan
Heng Tai
Hoi Fan
Hong Lok
Hong Ngai
Kei Cheong
Kei Lun
Kuan Tai
Lai Chi
Lam Ieng
G.D. Lam Pak
MFA Development (Macao U23)
C.D. Monte Carlo
Polícia de Segurança Pública
F.C. Porto de Macau
G.D. Negro Rubro
Serviços de Alfândega
Sporting Clube de Macau
Vá Luen

Windsor Arch Ka I

Macau
 

Football clubs